Volver a caer is a Mexican streaming television series based on Leo Tolstoy's 1877 novel Anna Karenina. The series stars Kate del Castillo, Maxi Iglesias and Rubén Zamora.

It premiered on Vix+ on 20 January 2023.

Premise 
Anna Montes de Oca is a gold medal-winning Mexican diver who falls in love with Vico, a young musician. Due to society's rejection of their romance, Anna and Vico embark on a journey of self-discovery.

Cast

Main 
 Kate del Castillo as Anna Montes de Oca
 Maxi Iglesias as Vico
 Rubén Zamora as Jandro
 Lucía Gómez Robledo as Kiti
 Edwarda Gurrola as Dolly
 Martín Altomaro as Óscar
 Daniel Tovar as Levin
 Alessandro Islas as Leo
 Verónica Terán as Ileana

Recurring and guest stars 
 Luis Rabago as Jorge
 Camila Nuñez as Lola
 Andre Tavera as Daniel
 Patricio Lucio as Santiago
 Mario Alberto Monroy as Nicolás
 Bárbara López as Mia
 Mar Carrera as Eva
 Karen Leone as Elsa
 Alan Gutiérrez as Adolfo
 Sofía Rivera as Saleswoman
 Marcela Ruiz as Juliette

Production

Development 
On 11 November 2021, it was announced that Pantaya and Endemol Shine Boomdog would co-produce an adaption of Leo Tolstoy's 1877 novel Anna Karenina, based on the 2015 Australian television adaptation The Beautiful Lie. On 23 March 2022, filming of the series began in Mexico City and lasted for six weeks. On 15 December 2022, it was announced that the series would premiere on Vix+, following TelevisaUnivision's acquisition of Pantaya. On 2 January 2023, it was announced that the series would premiere on 20 January 2023.

Casting 
On 11 November 2021, Kate del Castillo was cast in the lead role. On 23 March 2022, a complete cast list was announced.

Episodes

References

External links 
 

2020s Mexican television series
2023 Mexican television series debuts
Vix (streaming service) original programming
Spanish-language television shows
Mexican drama television series